Paraguarí is a city, distrito and capital of Paraguarí Department in Paraguay, located 66 km from the country's capital, Asunción.  At the 2002 census it had a population of 22,154.

Toponymy 
Paraguarí is called “The cradle of the National Independence”. In that city on January 13, 1811, the Paraguayans Yegros, Gamarra and Cabañas, with their troops, defeated the Argentine Army, commanded by the General Manuel Belgrano in the battle of Cerro Mbaé or Battle of Paraguarí.

Was founded in 1775 over a hill by Agustín Fernando de Pinedo, a time after the banishment of the Jesuits in Paraguay. On August 18, 1960 the town became a district.

Geography 
The city of Paraguarí is situated 66 km from Asunción, bordering to the north with the Altos Cordillera and to the south with a wide savanna.

It's surrounded by the hills Saint Thomas, Cerro Peró (Bald Hill) and Cerro Porteño.

Limits 
 To the north: City of Pirayú.
 To the east: Escobar.
 To the south: Sapucaí, Acahay and Carapeguá.
 To the west: Yaguarón.

Weather 
The average temperature is of 21 degrees Celsius, the maximum in summer is 39 degrees Celsius and the minimum in winter is 2 degrees Celsius.

Demography 
Paraguarí has 22,154 inhabitants, from which 11,053 are men and 11,101 women, according to the 2002 census. In the urban area are 8,307 inhabitants and in the rural area are 13,847.

Economy 
The expansion of the agriculture and livestock industry of the region and an important road network makes of Paraguarí the main supplier of Asunción.

It's a commercial center for the agriculture products of its inhabitants. Also is an important learning center in the region.

There exist also quarries from which granite and kaolin are extracted.

Transportation 
Paraguarí is 66 km away from Asunción following the Route 1 “Mariscal Francisco Solano López”.
To get to Paraguarí one can take an inter-urban bus at the Bus Terminal of Asunción, or at the Eusebio Ayala Road, where a bus leaves for Paraguarí about every 15 minutes.

Coming from the east following the Route 2 you must take the Rogelio Benítez Road (7th km) after crossing the detour to Eusebio Ayala.

History 
Paraguarí was founded by Agustín Fernando de Pinedo, ordered by Charles the Third, King of Spain, after the banishment of the Jesuits in Paraguay, where he overtook their properties: The ranches “Tavapy” and “Campo Grande”.

Many Spanish people moved to Paraguarí coming from Burgos and Andalucía.

The Company of Jesus in the 7th century was established in Paraguarí, in a great ranch until the banishment of the King Charles the Third.

Tourism 

Paraguarí has a number of attractions of interest to tourists. It has several picturesque districts, including the famous fruit stores of Paraguarí which are closely packed together, located to the side of the Route 1, and the Kamba Kokué, an old neighbourhood whose name testifies to the existence of black slaves in the Missiones. The train station of the city is one of the oldest in America, and the city's old church draws many visitors. The national Museum of Artillery is also located in the city and forms the seat of the Army's Artillery Command, displaying cannons, antique weapons, trophies, photographs and documents.

Annual bullfights - “toro moñaroha” in Guaraní language -  are organised alongside the city patrons' celebrations of Saint Thomas' day. The whole city participates in the event, making it an unmissable event.

Looking just beyond the city itself, the road between Paraguarí and Piribebuy is one of the prettiest of the country, connecting numerous tourist locations across a unique landscape of hills and brooks only a few miles away from Asunción. One of them is the Mbatovi reservation, located 72 km away from Asunción following the road that connects the Routes 1 and 2, the roadhouses of Chololó, Pinamar, Piraretá and others.

References

Geografía Ilustrada del Paraguay, Distribuidora Arami SRL; 2007. 
Geografía del Paraguay, Primera Edición 1999, Editorial Hispana Paraguay SRL

External links
Secretaria Nacional de Turismo
Dirección General de Encuestas, Estadísticas y Censos
Departamento de Paraguarí
ABC Color, Así es nuestro país
Asociación Biblioteca Virtual del Paraguay

Populated places in the Paraguarí Department